The German Women's volleyball League or in ( German : Volleyball-Bundesliga der Frauen ) is the highest division in German women's volleyball. The German champion has been determined in this competition since the 1976/77 season.

Current mode 
The women's Bundesliga is made up of 11 teams in the 2018/19 season. The last placed teams after the main round descends into the second division . The teams in the first eight places are qualified for the playoffs. Except for the playoff final ( best-of-five mode ), all games were first played in best-of-three mode .  In the season 2018/19 the first time the semi-finals in the best-of-five mode was held.

History 
The 2019/20 season was canceled on March 12, 2020 due to the COVID-19 pandemic before the final round of the main-round. A championship title was not awarded, there were also no relegations. It was the first time in the history of the Volleyball Bundesliga that a season ended prematurely.

Media 
Since the 2013/14 season there have been regular live broadcasts on the Internet of the matches of the First Bundesliga. The clubs will contribute 100,000 EUR to the production costs. The transfer of around 40 games is planned. During the main round, a top game is to be broadcast every week. In the play-offs, a game is to be shown live on every match day. SPORT1 has been broadcasting some games on free-to-air television since the 2017/18 season.

Viewers 
The record number of spectators in the Women's volleyball Bundesliga was set on April 30, 2016 by the play-off game between Allianz MTV Stuttgart and Dresdner SC. 5,392 spectators watched the game in the Stuttgart Porsche Arena, which Allianz MTV Stuttgart won 3–2. In second place in the list of the best of the audience follows the final game of the CJD Feuerbach against Bayern Lohhof in the Sindelfingen glass palace in 1987 with 5,000 spectators. In 2005 USC Münster played against the Rote Raben Vilsbiburg in front of a crowd of 4,500, third place on the leaderboard.

Strongest Women's League of Germany 
Measured by the number of spectators at home games, the Women's volleyball Bundesliga occupies a special position among team sports in Germany. In no other sport is the women's league stronger than the men's league. Of all professional leagues in Germany, Women's Volleyball Bundesliga has the highest audience average, even ahead of women in football, handball or basketball.

Germany - Women's Division 1 - DVL - Prize list since 1956/1957

Teams
The following teams compete in the Bundesliga during 2020-21 season:

 Ladies in Black Aachen
  Dresdner SC
 Black and White Erfurt
 USC Münster
  SC Potsdam
  SSC Palmberg Schwerin
 NawaRo Straubing
 Allianz MTV Stuttgart
  VfB Suhl Lotto Thuringia
 Rote Raben Vilsbiburg
 1. VC Wiesbaden

All-time team records
Since 1956/57:

Since 2015/16:

(Based on W=2 pts and D=1 pts)

See also
 Deutsche Volleyball-Bundesliga

References

External links
 Volleyball Bundesliga
 DVV official site
 VBL.tv - the Internet TV of the Bundesliga
 Dynamic statistics – Bundesliga database of the Suhler fan club
 Perpetual table 2014 (PDF-Datei; 622 KB)
 Bundesliga Frau. women.volleybox.net

Germany
1976 establishments in Germany
Women's volleyball in Germany 
Bundesliga Germany
Sports leagues in Germany
Professional sports leagues in Germany